Thompson is an unincorporated community in the town of Erin, in Washington County, Wisconsin, United States. It is located near Holy Hill.

Notes

Unincorporated communities in Washington County, Wisconsin
Unincorporated communities in Wisconsin